Caridina holthuisi is a species of freshwater shrimp in the family Atyidae, endemic to the Malili lake system in Sulawesi, Indonesia. It can be found in Lake Towuti, Lake Matano, and Lake Mahalona, as well as the Petea river. It is named in honour of Dutch carcinologist, Lipke Holthuis.

Habitat and ecology 
Caridina holthuisi can be primarily found in shallow water amongst leaf litter and other soft substrates.

References 

Crustaceans described in 2009
Atyidae
Freshwater crustaceans of Asia
Crustaceans of Indonesia
Endemic fauna of Indonesia
Endemic freshwater shrimp of Sulawesi